All Estonian narrow-gauge railways were built at the gauge of . Four museum lines and some industrial peat railways survive.

Railways
Kunda cement factory, the first narrow-gauge railway in Estonia, built 1886.
Pärnu–Mõisaküla–Valga line, 121 km, opened 1896.
Tallinn–Lelle–Türi–Viljandi–Mõisaküla line. 196 km, opened in several stages between 1897 and 1900. Short branch line from Türi to Paide, 14 km, opened 1901.
Valga–Mõniste–Ape–Alūksne–Gulbene line, opened in 1903.
Liiva–Vääna, 23 km, part of Peter the Great's Naval Fortress' railway network around Tallinn. The line to Vääna was built in several stages in 1913.
Paide–Tamsalu, 47 km, built during World War I as a military railway, opened to public passenger and freight traffic in 1918.
Riisselja–Orajõe, 44 km, opened 1923. In 1928 extended to Ikla, on the border to Latvia (5 km). In 1942 1 km long extension across the border to Ainazi, terminus of the  gauge Valmiera supply railway.
Lelle–Papiniidu (Pärnu), 71 km, opened 1928. 27-km long branch from Viluvere to Vändra.
Rapla–Virtsu, 96 km, opened 1931.
Sonda–Mustvee line in northeastern Estonia, 63 km with several branches.
Järvakandi glassworks, 15 km, industrial

Museums
 The Lavassaare railway museum houses a large collection of steam, diesel and electric locomotives with a 2 km long  gauge railway. 
 There is a museum with a  gauge, 500 m long line in Avinurme which houses one locomotive and a collection of wagons.
 An underground museum with a short electric line is located in Kiviõli in the Northeast-Estonian industrial area.
 A former military railway line with a  gauge is located on Naissaar island in the northern Estonia.

References